is a city in the center of the Oshima Subprefecture in Japan's northern island of Hokkaido. It serves as a bedroom community for Hakodate, to the east of the city. Hokuto was formed on February 1, 2006, from merging the town of Kamiiso, from Kamiiso District, and the town of Ōno, from Kameda District. Hokuto is the third city to be established in Oshima. (The second, Kameda, no longer exists being dissolved just two years after its founding in 1971). Hokuto is the second largest city in Oshima by population after Hakodate.

Geography
Hokuto is in the middle of Oshima, a peninsula in Hokkaido's south. The southeast portion is mostly plains and the western part is more mountainous. The south borders the Hakodate Bay. The Ōno River runs north and south through the middle of Hokuto.
Mountain: Katsuratake (734m)
Rivers: Ōno, Hekirichi
Lake: Kamiiso
Forest parks: Hachirounuma Koen

Neighboring regions 
 Oshima Subprefecture
 Hakodate City
 Kamiiso District: Kikonai Town
 Kameda District: Nanae Town
 Kayabe District: Mori Town
 Hiyama Subprefecture
 Hiyama District: Assabu Town

Climate

History
1900: Kamiiso village and Ono village were founded.
1918: Kamiiso village became Kamiiso town.
1955: Mobetsu village was merged into Kamiiso town.
1957: Ono village became Ono town.
2006: Kamiiso town and Ono town were merged to form Hokuto city.

Transportation

Rail
Oshima-Ōno Station was scheduled to be rebuilt and renamed Shin-Hakodate-Hokuto Station by the time the Hokkaido Shinkansen in March 2016.
 Esashi Line: Nanaehama - Higashi-Kunebetsu - Kunebetsu - Kiyokawaguchi - Kamiiso - Moheji - Oshima-Tōbetsu
 Hakodate Main Line: Shin-Hakodate-Hokuto
 Hokkaido Shinkansen: Shin-Hakodate-Hokuto

Road
 Hakodate-Esashi Expressway: Hokuto-Oiwake IC - Hokuto-chūō IC - Hokuto-Tomigawa IC - Hokuto-Moheji IC

Education

High schools
 Hokkaido Kamiiso High School
 Hokkaido Ono Agricultural High School
 Hokkaido Hakodate fisheries High School

References

External links 

Official Website 

 
Cities in Hokkaido